The European Association of Service providers for Persons with Disabilities (abbreviated: EASPD), based in Brussels, Belgium, is an umbrella organization that represents approximately 17,000 support service providers for persons with disabilities from 33 European countries at a European level.

History 
EASPD was founded in 1996 with 5 partners. As the organisation began to grow, it held its first conference in 1999 in Dublin, Ireland, the topic being “Partnership— the key to quality services”. By 2001, EASPD represented 5,000 services, and had become a member of European NGOs Social Platform and ECAS (Euro Citizen Advice Service), and had signed cooperation agreements with IASSID and Inclusion Europe. Over the next 10 years, EASPD continued to grow, and until now has built a network that currently represents over 17.000 support services for persons with disabilities and their families all over Europe. The services represented cover the entire life cycle of the individual and include early intervention, education, employment, housing, leisure, culture, day-care, elder and residential support services.

In 2011 EASPD, together with Eurodiaconia, Workability Europe, EPR, Solidar, FEANTSA, CEDAG, Caritas (joined later), and the Red Cross (joined later) launched Social Services Europe, a European platform for not for profit providers of health and social services. In 2013 EASPD was accredited as NGO to the Conference of States Parties to the United Nations Convention on the Rights of Persons with Disabilities, and launched its first "Employment for All" Award. By 2015, EASPD represented over 12,000 service providers, became a member of EDF, and entered into a partnership with the Zero Project.

In 2016 EASPD moved its headquarters to Rue du Commerce, Handelsstraat in Brussels and elected its current president, James Crowe. In 2017, EASPD launched their second website, socialinvetment.eu, to help social service providers get better loans through the EU Investment Plan and the European Investment Bank. In January 2018, EASPD launched its new multiannual Strategy "Commit!" to support its work.

Logos

EASPD Presidents 

 1996 - 1997 Marie-Claire Rens of F.I.S.S.A.A.J Belgium
1997 - 1999 Roger Acton Director of Disability Federation Ireland
 1999 - 2005 Luk Zelderloo of Tau-groep Belgium
 2005 - 2008 Brian O'Donnell CEO of the National Federation of Voluntary Bodies Ireland
 2008 - 2016 Franz Wolfmayr President of Steierische Behindertenhilfe Dachverband Austria
 2016-  Present James Crowe, UK

References

External links
 EASPD Website
 EASPD: Zehn bewährte Verfahren zur Beschäftigungsförderung von Menschen mit Behinderung
 Ilja Seifert: Die Europäische Strategie zugunsten von Menschen mit Behinderungen als Instrument zur Umsetzung des UNCRPD: Auswirkungen auf die Politik der EU und der nationalen Ebene. Sprachendienst des Deutschen Bundestags. 3. Mai 2012

Organisations based in Belgium
Organizations established in 1996